Philipp Marx and Igor Zelenay were the defending champions; however, Marx decided not to participate.
Zelenay partners up with Daniele Bracciali. They lost in the first round against Brian Battistone and Andreas Siljeström.
British pair Colin Fleming and Jamie Murray defeated Travis Parrott and Filip Polášek 6–2, 3–6, [10–6] in the final.

Seeds

Draw

Draw

External links
 Main Draw

Ritro Slovak Open - Doubles
2010 Men's Doubles